The Warrego colonial by-election, 1870 was a by-election held on 5 January 1870 in the electoral district of Warrego for the Queensland Legislative Assembly.

History
On 23 November 1869, Arthur Hodgson, the member for Warrego, resigned. Thomas McIlwraith won the resulting by-election on 5 January 1870.

See also
 Members of the Queensland Legislative Assembly, 1868–1870

References

1870 elections in Australia
Queensland state by-elections
1870s in Queensland